Pasquale Petrolo (Rome, 27 August 1962) and Claudio Gregori (Rome, 17 November 1963), best known as Lillo & Greg, are an Italian comedy duo who work on stage, film, television, radio as well as musicians, authors and cartoonists.

Life and career 
Petrolo and Gregori first met in 1986, when they both worked as cartoonists  for the same publishing house, ACME (Petrolo as author of Zio Tibia, realized together with Michelangelo La Neve, while Gregori for I sottotitolati). When in 1991 the publishing house failed, the two decided to engage in new projects, most notably the creation of a comedy rock group, Latte & i Suoi Derivati ("Milk & Its Derivatives"). Active in television, radio, on stage and in films, they are among the creators of the TV-program Le Iene, and since 2003 they are authors and hosts of the program 610 - Sei Uno Zero on Radio 2.

Filmography 
Bagnomaria (1999)
Blek Giek (2001) 
Per non dimenticarti (2006)
Lillo e Greg - The Movie! (2007) 
Colpi di fulmine (2012) 
Colpi di fortuna (2013)
Un Natale stupefacente (2014) 
Natale col Boss (2015)
Natale a Londra – Dio salvi la regina (2016)
D.N.A. - Decisamente non adatti (2020)
Permette? Alberto Sordi (2020)
LOL - Chi ride è fuori (2020) (Lillo)

References

External links 
 

Italian male film actors
Mass media people from Rome
Italian comedy duos
Living people
Italian male stage actors
Italian television presenters
Italian comedians
Italian male writers
Italian cartoonists
Italian radio presenters
Italian radio personalities
Italian television writers
Male screenwriters
Male television writers
Year of birth missing (living people)